Rafael Corkidi Acriche (20 May 1930 – 18 September 2013) was a Mexican cinematographer, film director and screenwriter. He began his career as a cinematographer and contributed to the visual style and cinematography in three films directed by Alejandro Jodorowsky in Mexico, Fando y Lis, El Topo, and The Holy Mountain. Eventually he became a director in his own right, including films such as Angels and Cherubs, Auandar Anapu, Pafnucio Santo and Deseos, his last film before he decided to pioneer video as a mean of expression.

In 2013, he was awarded the Ariel de Oro, Mexico's top film prize, for his contributions to the Mexican film industry.

Selected filmography / videography
 Fando y Lis (1968) (cinematographer)
 El Topo (1970) (cinematographer)
 Apolinar (1971) (cinematographer)
 Angels and Cherubs (1972)
 The Mansion of Madness (1973)
 The Holy Mountain (1973) (cinematographer)
 Auandar Anapu (1975)
 Pafnucio Santo (1977)
 Deseos (1978) 

Video
 Las Lupitas (1984)
 Figuras de la pasión (1984)
 Relatos (short) (1986)
 Huelga / Strike  (documentary short) (1987)
 Señores y señoras (documentary short) (1988)
 Querida Benita (short) (1989)
 Forjadores (documentary short) (1990)
 Murmullos (1991)
 Folklor (1991)
 Rulfo aeternum  (1992)
 Urbano y Natalia (short) (1994)
 El maestro prodigioso (2010)

References

External links

1930 births
2013 deaths
Mexican cinematographers
Mexican film directors
Mexican screenwriters
People from Puebla (city)